The 2022 Toppserien is the 36th season of the highest women's football league in Norway. The season started on 20 March 2022.

Format
This season is the first with a new play-off system. It was set to be introduced in the 2020 season, but it was postponed due to the COVID-19 pandemic.

Teams

The defending champions Sandviken changed their name to Brann. Røa were promoted from the 2021 First Division.

Regular season
In the regular season, the league consists of 10 teams, who play each other twice, totalling 18 matches per team. The top four teams qualify for the championship round, while the bottom six qualify for the relegation round, along with the top two teams from the First Division.

Results

Championship round
In the championship round, the four teams start with 6, 4, 2 and 0 points respectively, based on their position in the regular season. They play each other twice, totalling six matches per team. The winners and runners-up qualify for the Champions League first round.

Results

Relegation round
In the relegation round, all eight teams start with 0 points. Each team plays seven matches. A draw decides which teams get three home matches and which teams get four home matches. The bottom two teams are relegated, while the sixth placed team takes part in a relegation play-off against the first placed team of the First Division play-offs.

Results

Relegation play-offs
The sixth placed team of the relegation round, Avaldsnes, faced the first placed team of the First Division play-offs, Øvrevoll Hosle, in a two-legged play-off to decide who would play in the 2023 Toppserien.

Avaldsnes won 3–2 on aggregate and both teams remained in their respective leagues.

Season statistics

Top scorers

References

External links
Official website
2022 Toppserien at Soccerway.com

Toppserien seasons
Top level Norwegian women's football league seasons
1
Norway
Norway